The Journal of Futures Studies (JFS) is a quarterly peer-reviewed academic journal in the discipline of futures studies. It is published by Tamkang University Press on behalf of the Graduate Institute of Futures Studies at Tamkang University in Tamsui, Taipei, in Taiwan. The journal is published quarterly, in the months of February, May, August, and November.

History

JFS was first published in November 1996. Its publication history can be divided into the following periods:

 November 1996-May 2000 (first four volumes): The journal was published twice a year, in November and May respectively, and each volume of the journal contained one year's November issue and the next year's May issue.
 August 2000-present: The journal has been published quarterly, with a given volume featuring the issues from August and November of one year and February and May of the next year.

Reception and popularity

The SCImago Journal Rank database says that the h-index of the journal (restricted to years of coverage 2005-2012) is 7 and the impact factor is about 0.25.

See also

Technological Forecasting and Social Change
Futures
Futures & Foresight Science
Foresight
European Journal of Futures Research

References

External links

Futurology journals
1996 establishments in Taiwan
Publications established in 1996